Fiserv, Inc. is an American multinational company headquartered in Brookfield, Wisconsin that provides financial technology services to clients across the financial services sector, including: banks, thrifts, credit unions, securities broker dealers, mortgage, insurance, leasing and finance companies, and retailers.

In October 2015, American Banker and BAI ranked the company third by revenue among technology providers to U.S. banks. Fiserv reported total revenue of $10.187 billion in 2019. Fiserv is also the owner of First Data, which connects 2 million ATMs through the STAR network.

Fiserv currently has the naming rights for the Fiserv Forum stadium in Milwaukee, Wisconsin.

History
Fiserv was founded in 1984. The company quickly grew and was listed on the NASDAQ less than two years after its founding, mainly through a large number of acquisitions, the largest in the early years of the company being Citicorp Information Resources. Fiserv's website was launched in 1995 and subsequently debuted fully electronic bills (branded as E-bills) in 1997. Fiserv reached $1 billion in revenue.  Between 2000 and 2017, Fiserv continued to acquire other companies, including CheckFree Corporation, M-Com, CashEdge, and PCLender.

In 2005, Jeffery Yabuki became the CEO. In 2020, Yabuki stepped down as CEO and was replaced by Frank Bisignano.

Company timeline including acquisitions 
1991
 Citicorp Information Resources — a subsidiary of Citicorp. This acquisition put Fiserv into the commercial banking, internal and credit union core account processing market space.
1995
 Information Technology, Inc., (ITI) — in Lincoln, Nebraska. This gained Premier, at that time the most widely implemented account processing platform in the US, and grew its number of account processing clients.
2003
 General American Corporation (GAC)
 CNS (Consumer Network Services)
2005
 Del Mar Database
 Assets of U.S. eLending business from Emergis
 Interactive Technologies
 Administrative Services Group Inc.
 JW Hutton
 BillMatrix
 VerticalPoint
 Xcipio, Inc.
2006
 CareGain, Inc. 
 Asset of CT Insurance Services & CCH Wall Street
2007
 NetEconomy.
 CheckFree — which had itself just acquired Corillian, Carreker, PhoneCharge and Upstream Technologies LLC. Fiserv's largest acquisition to date, CheckFree was then the leading provider of online banking, online bill payment, electronic bill payment services, and software for check clearance and ACH (also known as direct debit) processing.
2008
 Interactive Technologies, Inc. — billing software and ancillary products for the banking and investment advisory industries, especially for their "Advantage Fee System" that calculates complex billing for fees and commissions.
 i_Tech — a Montana-based item processing company that had been owned by First Interstate Bank
 The Data Center — a Texas-based item processing company that had been owned by BBVA Compass Bank
2010
 AdviceAmerica — software for financial institutions.
2011
 M-Com — established in 2000 and based in Auckland, New Zealand, M-Com developed mobile banking apps. 
 Maverick Network Solutions — established in 2006 and based in Brandywine Hundred, Delaware.
 CashEdge — to payment solutions, including Popmoney.
2013
 Open Solutions, Inc. — account processing DNA platform. Fiserv paid $55 million to acquire DNA, by taking on $960 million in debt.
2016
 Community Financial Services — from ACI Worldwide.
 Convenience Pay — from Hewlett Packard.
2017
 Dovetail.
 Monitise.
2018
 MoneyPass — surcharge-free debit card and ATM processing network, acquired from Elan Financial Services, a unit of U.S. Bancorp.
2019
 First Data — payment processor acquired for $22 billion, making it one of the largest acquisitions in the financial technology sector.
2020
 Bypass Mobile — enterprise point of sale platform.
2021
 Ondot Systems, Inc. — digital experience platform for financial institutions.
 NetPay — payment facilitator,
2022
 Finxact — cloud-based core banking services.
 Layoffs — Significant layoffs occurred.  Anonymous sources reported that Fiserv's internal WorkDay took reported that headcount is down to 35,608 as of October 20th.
 TIF District -- A tax incremental financing district was created to incentivize Fiserv to remain in downtown Milwaukee, the 7 million dollars will be available through annual payments, with the condition Fiserv must base at least 780 employees at the downtown location.

References

External links
 

Financial technology companies
Financial services companies of the United States
Information technology consulting firms of the United States
Companies based in Wisconsin
Financial services companies established in 1984
American companies established in 1984
Companies listed on the Nasdaq
Waukesha County, Wisconsin
1980s initial public offerings
Kohlberg Kravis Roberts companies